My Favorite Martian is an American sitcom that aired on CBS from September 29, 1963, to May 1, 1966, for 107 episodes. The show stars Ray Walston as "Uncle Martin" (the Martian) and Bill Bixby as Tim O'Hara. The first two seasons, totaling 75 episodes, were in black and white, and the 32 episodes of the third and final season were filmed in color.

John L. Greene created the central characters and developed the core format of the series, which was produced by Jack Chertok.

Premise
A human-appearing extraterrestrial in a one-man spaceship nearly collides at high altitude with the U.S. Air Force's rocket plane, the North American X-15. The spaceship's pilot is a 450-year-old anthropologist from Mars. Tim O'Hara, a young newspaper reporter for The Los Angeles Sun, is on his way home from Edwards Air Force Base, where he had gone to report on the flight of the X-15. Returning home to Los Angeles, O'Hara spots the same silver spaceship coming down quickly, after which it crash lands nearby.

Tim takes in the Martian, saying to other people that he is Tim's Uncle Martin. The Martian refuses to reveal any of his special traits to humans, other than Tim, to avoid both publicity and human panic. Tim agrees to keep the Martian's Earth identity a secret while he attempts to repair his spaceship. Uncle Martin has various unusual powers: He can raise two retractable antennae from the back of his head and become invisible; he is telepathic and can read and influence minds; he can levitate objects with the motion of his index finger; he can communicate with animals; he can freeze people or objects; and he can speed himself (and other people) up to do any kind of work.

Also an inventor, Uncle Martin builds several advanced devices, such as a time machine that transports Tim and the Martian to England in the Middle Ages and other times and places, such as St. Louis in 1849 and the early days of Hollywood, and brings Leonardo da Vinci and Jesse James into the present. Another device he builds is a "molecular separator" that can take apart the molecules of a physical object, or rearrange them (making a squirrel into a human). Another device can take memories and store them in pill form to "relearn" them later. Other devices create temporary duplicates, or levitate Martin and others without the need of his index finger.

Tim and Uncle Martin live in a garage apartment owned by a congenial but scatterbrained landlady, Mrs. Lorelei Brown (a former WAVE as revealed in the first episode of season one) who often shows up when not wanted. The Martian and she have an awkward romance from time to time, but Uncle Martin never gets serious for fear of his ultimately going home to Mars. She later dates a vain, cold-hearted, plain-clothes police officer, Detective Bill Brennan, who dislikes Uncle Martin and is highly suspicious of him and his activities.

"Martin O'Hara's" real name is actually Exigius 12. Revealed in the episode "We Love You, Miss Pringle", it was heard again when his real nephew, Andromeda (played by young actor Wayne Stam), crash-landed on Earth late in the show's third season. Andromeda, originally devised to bring younger viewers to the show, disappeared without explanation after this single episode, and was not referred to again in the live-action series' eight remaining episodes. Andromeda was, however, a regular on the later My Favorite Martians animated series. Andromeda had a single antenna, which Martin explained was because his baby antennae had fallen out and only one adult antenna had come in so far. Uncle Martin also reveals that on Mars he lives on Fulton Canal, which ultimately leads to comedic mix-ups and confusion with Canal Fulton, Ohio.

Cast

 Ray Walston as Uncle Martin O'Hara (the Martian)
 Bill Bixby as Tim O'Hara
 Pamela Britton as Mrs. Lorelei Brown
 J. Pat O'Malley as Mr. Burns, Tim's boss (first season)
 Alan Hewitt as Detective Bill Brennan (second and third seasons)
 Roy Engel as Police Captain (third season)

Production

Development and distribution
The series was produced by Jack Chertok Television in association with CBS Productions. The show was originally syndicated by Wolper Pictures, then it moved to syndicator Telepictures, and finally by successor-in-interest to Warner Bros. Television Distribution. The Chertok Company retained ownership of all copyrights for the series; Rhino Entertainment held U.S. video distribution rights until August 2008. Australian entertainment company Umbrella Entertainment acquired distribution rights for Australia and New Zealand and released seasons one through three (the last in full color) in 2007 and 2008 on region-free DVD. Those rights, together with video streaming, were acquired by Shock Video; in November 2017 Shock released a new complete boxed set of the series using restored show elements. In 2010, MPI Home Video acquired the series distribution rights for home video. In 2018, Pidax Video Germany acquired both streaming and DVD distribution rights for Germany and released the series the same year under its German title Mein Onkel vom Mars; As of early July 2013, Warner Bros. held domestic and international syndication rights for the series. Those rights have since returned to the Chertok Trust.

Music
The theme music for the series was composed by George Greeley and performed in part on an Electro-Theremin by Paul Tanner, a former member of Glenn Miller's band. It was influential in Brian Wilson's engagement of Tanner in 1965 and 1966 to work with the Beach Boys on their landmark hit, "Good Vibrations". Greeley also scored the series; an album of his music from the first two seasons was released by La-La Land Records in 2007 (dedicated to the composer, who died while the album was being prepared).

Filming
Unhappy with early script submissions from creator/producer Jack Chertok, the network hired script doctor Sherwood Schwartz to lend a hand. Schwartz changed the Tim-centric scripts to focus more on the Martian, as a "fish out of water", on, as he termed it "this backwards planet." The pilot featured Mrs. Brown's daughter Annabelle as Tim's love interest, but she was dropped to allow Tim to become more of a playboy. In a major change, Mrs. Brown, who was multi-talented, intelligent, and suspicious in the pilot, became decidedly more scatterbrained.

The first two seasons were filmed in black-and-white (at Desilu), but the final season was shot in color (at MGM), resulting in minor changes in the set and the format of the show. In addition to the extraterrestrial powers indicated in the first two seasons, Martin was able to do much more in the final season, such as stimulating mustache growth to provide Tim and himself with quick disguises, and levitating using his nose. Brennan's boss, the police chief, was involved in many episodes in the third season, generally as a device to humiliate the overzealous detective Brennan.

Comparison to other shows
My Favorite Martian, which premiered in the fall of 1963, was the first of "fantasy" situation comedies prevalent on American television in the mid-1960s featuring characters who could do extraordinary things, predating My Living Doll (1964–1965), Bewitched (1964–1972), and I Dream of Jeannie (1965–1970).

Episodes

Series overview

Season 1 (1963–64)

Season 2 (1964–65)

Season 3 (1965–66)
All episodes now in color.

Home media
Rhino Entertainment released the first two seasons on Region 1 DVD in 2004–2005. Rhino never released the third season. However, the season 3 release from Australia's Umbrella Entertainment, on February 5, 2008, was as an import to North America. This release is classified as "Region 0", making it viewable around the world on any region-free DVD player. Rhino also released a 3-DVD box of "The Best of My Favorite Martian" in 2007, comprising episodes 1, 2, 3, 5, 7, 9, 14, 16, 18, 22, 24, 29, 31, 34, and 37.

In January 2010, MPI Home Video acquired the series' Region 1 rights under license from Jack Chertok Productions. At the time, it was announced that they planned on releasing season 3 on DVD in the summer of 2010. This release, however, never materialized and was postponed. It was subsequently released on October 30, 2012.

MPI re-released season 1 on June 24, 2014. and season 2 on December 23, 2014.

On October 20, 2015, MPI Home Video released My Favorite Martian- The Complete Series on Region 1 DVD.

In Region 4 (Australia), Umbrella Entertainment released all 3 seasons on DVD. These releases are all Region Free. The season 1 release includes special features, such as audio commentary with Ann Marshall, a stills gallery, script, and interview with Ann Marshall. The season 3 release also includes special features, such as an unaired version of the series pilot, behind the scenes home movies, interviews with Stan Frazen, Ted Rich, James Hulsey, and Wayne Stam, as well as audio commentary by James's Hulsey and Chertok historian and licensing manager Peter Greenwood. In addition, there are also scans of the original comic series, scripts, and the shooting schedule.

Reception
In its first season, My Favorite Martian did extremely well in the Nielsen ratings, ranking at No. 10. However, by the end of the second season the show had dipped to No. 24. Still, the series was doing well enough to be renewed for a third season. Ratings dipped even further in the third season due to repetitive story lines involving Martin's time machine, and the series was canceled.

Spin-offs

Animated series

An animated series, My Favorite Martians, was made by Filmation and was broadcast as part of the Saturday morning programming on CBS from September 8, 1973, to December 22, 1973, for a total of sixteen episodes. The series features Tim, Martin, Mrs. Brown and Detective Brennan (Brennan is considerably different). To appeal to a younger audience, Uncle Martin is joined by his Martian nephew named Andromeda, nicknamed "Andy", who only has one antenna and thus lesser powers than Uncle Martin and did appear in one episode of the live-action series. The pair also have a Martian pet named Okey, a sort of bouncing sheepdog with antennae. Tim also had a niece of his own, named Katie, living with them. Brennan also had a teenage son named Brad living with him and a pet chimpanzee named Chump. None of the characters were voiced by the original actors; Bixby was at the time committed to his latest project, The Magician, and Walston tried to distance himself from the role. As a result, Jonathan Harris voiced Martin and Jane Webb voiced Mrs. Brown.

The cartoon utilized a number of scripts from what would have been season four of the live action show; as of early July 2013, Jack Chertok Television co-owned it, with the Chertok company retaining all merchandising rights to the show.

At least two VHS tape volumes were released of the cartoon series in 1989 by UAV. Distribution rights were held, as of April 2013, by Classic Media as part of their Filmation holdings.

Episodes

In other media

Feature film

The series was also remade as a feature film in 1999 starring Christopher Lloyd as the Martian and Jeff Daniels as Tim. This film was released and distributed by Walt Disney Pictures. Ray Walston was featured in the film (both Bill Bixby and Pamela Britton had since died; the former in 1993 and the latter in 1974) and played another Martian who had been trapped on Earth since the time of the first series and wore a similar space suit from the series; his cover was now that of a Government investigator of unidentified flying objects. However, the premise was changed: Martians such as Lloyd's Uncle Martin are now non-humanoids with four arms, four legs, and three eyes who use a gumball (which they call "nerplex") to assume human form. The "nerplex" comes in a selection that will turn the person ingesting it into assorted life forms, including Martian, Venusian and one to "never use" (Venox 7).

Comics
The TV series was adapted into comic book form by Dan Spiegle and was distributed by Gold Key Comics; it lasted nine issues and ran from 1963 through 1966. Gerry Anderson's company Century 21 acquired the rights to produce a comic strip adaption; it ran in their weekly newspaper, formatted comic TV21, for two years (1965–66) and was featured in three of the British Christmas comics annuals. Unlike the Gold Key Comics adaption, the British strip, in its later run, featured Martin's nephew Andromeda. Due to a lack of reference he was depicted as a chubby freckled British schoolboy.

The comic rights returned to the Chertok company, who licensed a reprint of the Gold Key title produced by Hermes Press. Hermes Press put out one volume of a two volume set that covered issues #1-7 of the Gold Key series. The planned second would complete the Gold Key run and include the TV21 material. They also subsequently issued a special single issue edition reprint for the national free comic book day. That reprint is the only instance of a 1960s television comic reprint being used for this event. Subsequently, during the event, the books, in almost every venue, were the first to sell out. The Chertok Company is actively looking to reprint, for the first time, the British comic adaption in a single, stand-alone volume. However, the TV21 Martian pages have been used as special features on the US DVD release of the TV series from MPI, for the Australian DVD release from Umbrella Entertainment, and more recently on the Australia New Zealand DVD release from Shock Entertainment.

Merchandising
During the show's initial run, several products were produced resulting in a board game, a magic set, a paint by numbers set, and a springs with bells beanie hat.

Licensing resumed in 2012 on the My Favorite Martian property, resulting in both a scale plastic model kit of Uncle Martin's spaceship and a built up version, both from Pegasus Hobbies. Due to the success of the model kit, the Chertok company subsequently has extended the Pegasus license.

The Pegasus model kit is in fact a scale replica based on the Martian spaceship's appearance as seen in the series episode "Crash Diet", where the spaceship is shrunken down in size; the initial version of the shrunken spaceship is in the same scale used for the Pegasus model. A still of Uncle Martin holding that scaled space ship was placed on the back of the product carton for the assembled, non-kit spaceship.

An after-market photo-etched metal detail parts kit from the Paragrafix Company gives modelers the ability to seriously upgrade the model kit's cockpit detail. They also for the first time created a scale version of the time machine suitcase, along with offering Uncle Martin's flight log book reproduced in both English and Martian text.

Factory Entertainment produced a shake ems version of both Uncle Martin and his spaceship. They also offered a special edition black-and-white version of their Uncle Martin statue as a San Diego Comic Con International exclusive.

In 2015 Greenlight Collectibles produced a prototype My Favorite Martian boxed set featuring the second season's Plymouth Fury, as seen in the show.

In November 2017 Zynga Entertainment added My Favorite Martian to its cell phone game "Black Diamond Casino".

See also

3rd Rock from the Sun
ALF
Marvin Marvin
Mork & Mindy
The Neighbors

References

External linksMy Favorite Martian: 
 
 Extensive Overview of My Favorite Martian
 Another look at My Favorite MartianMy Favorite Martians:'
 
 

American fantasy television series
Black-and-white American television shows
CBS original programming
English-language television shows
Fictional Martians
Fictional telepaths
Mars in television
Television series about alien visitations
Television series about journalism
Television shows adapted into comics
Television shows adapted into films
Television shows set in Los Angeles
1960s American comic science fiction television series
1960s American sitcoms
1963 American television series debuts
1966 American television series endings